MOCNESS is the acronym for Multiple Opening/Closing Net and Environmental Sensing System and is a net system for plankton in the ocean. The system is towed behind a research vessel with a speed of up to 2.5 knots and consists of five to twenty nets with a mesh size from 64 μm to 3 mm and an area of 0.25 to 20 m2 (although the last one is a 2x10 m systems) which are opened and closed computer controlled at desired depth. The net enables biologists to catch zooplankton and nekton in various depth horizons typically anywhere in the upper 6000 m of the oceans. All MOCNESS systems are capable of sampling to 6000 meters depth (10,000 psi). The system includes SeaBird probes to measure salinity and temperature at sampling depths, as well as optional dissolved oxygen, PAR (photosynthetically available light), transmissometry and fluorescence sensors.

References
P. H. Wiebe et al., 1985, New development in the MOCNESS, an apparatus for sampling zooplankton and micronekton, Marine Biology, 87(3), 313-323, 

Planktology